Distal interphalangeal joints are the articulations between the phalanges of the hand or foot. This term therefore includes:

 Interphalangeal joints of the hand
 Interphalangeal joints of the foot

Joints